Sampsel may refer to:

Sampsel, Missouri, an unincorporated community in Livingston County, Missouri, United States
Sampsel Township, Livingston County, Missouri, a township in Livingston County, Missouri, United States